Lean Times (German: Magere Zeiten) is a West German television series which originally aired on ARD in 1978.

Selected cast
 Karin Anselm as  Bettina Basdorf
 Margot Leonard as  Hanna Hergenrath
 Wolfgang Völz as Atze Müller
 Christian Hanft as Sigbert Hergenrath
 Wieslawa Wesolowska as Hildegard Hergenrath
 Gerd Baltus as  Dr. Peter Helfrich
 Ilse Pagé as  Conny Finkbein
 Günter Strack as  Alfred Mildezahn
 Johannes Grossmann as Walter Burger
 Walter Buschhoff as  Fritz Kohlwitz

References

Bibliography
 Jovan Evermann. Der Serien-Guide: M-S. Schwarzkopf & Schwarzkopf, 1999.

External links
 

1978 German television series debuts
1978 German television series endings
1970s drama television series
German-language television shows